The Locos are a Spanish ska punk band formed in 2005. The Locos were founded as a side project by Pipi, the backup vocalist  for Spanish ska-punk group Ska-P, after the latter dissolved that same year. Although originally inclined not to rejoin Ska-P subsequent to their break-up, Pipi now divides his efforts between the two bands.

After a worldwide tour that spanned 2005 to 2007, a second Locos album was slated for release in April 2008, called Energía Inagotable.

Members
Pipi - vocals
Niño - guitar
Tommy - bass
Ivan  - drums
Luis Fran - trumpet
Fer - guitar
Zampa - saxophones

Discography
Albums
Jaula de Grillos - 2006
Energía Inagotable - 2008
Tiempos Difíciles - 2012

See also
Ska-P

References

RCA Records artists
Rock en Español music groups
Sony BMG artists